Amellus is a genus of flowering plants in the family Asteraceae described as a genus by Linnaeus in 1759.

Amellus is native to southern Africa (South Africa, Namibia, Botswana).

 Species

References

Astereae
Asteraceae genera
Flora of Southern Africa